Galidor: Defenders of the Outer Dimension, sometimes shortened as Galidor, is a 2002 television series that ran on YTV in Canada and Fox Kids in the United States in 2002 with a total of 26 half-hour episodes.  The series was created by Thomas W. Lynch, the creator of The Secret World of Alex Mack and The Journey of Allen Strange; and funded and owned by the Lego Group. It was the final series to launch on Fox Kids, as the brand folded in the United States only 7 months after its debut.

Plot
The show is centered upon Nick Bluetooth, a 15-year-old boy led (with his best friend Allegra Zane) by an extraterrestrial map to a spacecraft nicknamed the Egg, which moves them into an "Outer Dimension" threatened by Gorm. They are now there to protect the story's eponymous dimension. To defeat Gorm, Nick must find all the pieces of a key that will unlock the sealed gates to the kingdom of Galidor, one of many realms comprising the dimension.

Characters

Heroes
 Nicholas "Nick" Bluetooth (played by Matthew Ewald) – A boy of 15 years' age, able to transform his limbs into the limbs of other species or specialized machines (called "glinching"). Reckless, but anxious to correctly answer the given situation. His surname refers to the Danish king Harald Bluetooth, who unified Denmark and Norway.
 Allegra Zane (played by Marie-Marguerite Sabongui) – Nick's best friend and a karate expert, and often sedate in his moments of recklessness. Anxious to return to Earth until persuaded otherwise by natives.
 Jens (performed by Sam Magdi, voiced by Michael O'Reilly) – The Chief Scientist of the Royal Court of Galidor. Originally plant-like creature called a Wexer, his body was burned by Gorm and his mind was placed into a robot body. Usually appears panicky and speaks in a high-pitched voice. Halfway through the show, his claw-like hands are replaced with more articulate gloves.
 Euripides (performed by Jeff Hall, voiced by Georges Morris) – The Scholar of the Royal Court of Galidor. He is a large anthropomorphic frog-like creature called an Amphibib and is the last of his species. Euripides is Nicholas's advisor and capable of telekinesis with his staff and limited heat generation. He is named for the ancient Greek tragedian Euripides.
 Nepol (performed by Claude Girous, voiced by Walter Massey) – A blue-furred, large-eyed humanoid called a Siktari who was reduced in size by Gorm. Visually impaired, he needs glasses. He wields a luka (an icy-looking spear), runs at great speed, and can project ice or cold to freeze anything.

Supporting characters
 Samuel "The Stranger" Bluetooth (played by Randy Thomas) – Father of Nicholas. An adventurer and scientist who constructed the Egg and underwent adventures in the Outer Dimension, eventually gaining a seat on Galidor's council before marrying Queen Riana. In the beginning of the series, he is seen falling into a chasm, but shown as Gorm's captive in the final episode's cliffhanger.
 Queen Riana (played by Tara Leigh) – The Queen of Galidor and mother of Nicholas. Appears in the series mostly as a mental hologram that only Nicholas can see, offering cryptic advice and warnings. In "Relativity," it is revealed that Queen Riana has a sister named Tyreena who lives in a village on Elta-Siktar, Nepol's home realm.
 Lind (played by Karen Cliche) – A native Galidorian who can dissolve at will into a purple gel. Originally trained by Gorm to take his place as chief counsel to the Outer Dimension, she defects to Nick's cause.

Villains
 Gorm (performed by Derrick Damon Reeve and Steven P. Park, voiced by Ian Finlay) – The main antagonist of the series. Once the chief advisor of the Royal Court of Galidor, he plotted against Sam and Queen Riana by causing a riot on Kek. After his plot was exposed, Queen Riana repelled him and banished him from Galidor. Since then, Gorm has conquered many realms, wiped out some species (like the Amphibibs), shrunk Nepol, burned Jens' body, and made a virus in the Outer Dimension's Maps. As such he is known as the "Conqueror of a Thousand Worlds." Gorm has since sought to take over Galidor and has enlisted many allies to help him in his quest. He has the ability to glinch, which is amplified by a device on his chest. Among Gorm's other skills are his immense strength, telekinesis, intellect, and ability to create illusions.
 Bala (played by Sean Devine) – A cyborg humanoid called a Herpitoid, Bala is a bounty hunter working for Gorm. He attacks with an energy bolt that becomes a claw upon impact.
 Tager – Gorm's righthand advisor who influenced Gorm's conquest.
 Caliphonic – The leader of the anthropomorphic lizard-like Aquart race and an ally of Gorm.

Episodes

Season 1
 Identity (written by Thomas W. Lynch, directed by George Mihalka)
 Euripides, Please (written by Thomas W. Lynch, directed by Giles Walker)
 All For One, One For Nepol (written by Jonas Agin and Vijal Patel, directed by Jim Donovan)
 Bouncing Off The Walls (written by Shari Goodhartz, directed by George Mihalka)
 Dust Til’ Dawn (written by Jonas E. Agin and Vijal M. Patel, directed by Giles Walker)
 Belonging (written by Chad Fiveash and James Stotereaux, directed by Adam Weissman)
 Crack In The Map (written by Doug Cooney, directed by George Mihalka)
 Seeing Is Just Seeing (written by Terry Saltsman, directed by Giles Walker)
 Truth, Lies, And Videotape (written by Alex Epstein, directed by Jim Donovan)
 Just Because You're Paranoid (written by Alex Epstein, directed by Adam Weissman)
 Frozen Feud (written by Vijal M. Patel, directed by George Mihalka)
 Relativity (written by Damian Kindler, directed by Jean-Claude Lord)
 It's Deja Vu All Over Again (written by Tom Chehak, directed by Adam Weissman)
 The Road To Kek (written by Tom Chehak, directed by George Mihalka)
 A Room With No View (written by Leila Bensen and Dave Preston, directed by Adam Weissman)
 Escape From Kek (written by Alex Epstein, directed by Adam Weissman)

Season 2
 Pieces Of Nick (written by Tom Chehak, directed by Patrick Williams)
 A Tale Of Two Nicks (written by Laura Kosterski, directed by Roger Cantin)
 Go For The Bronze (written by Jana Veverka, directed by Patrick Williams)
 State Of The Art (written by John Mandel, directed by John L’Ecuyer) 
 The Great Glinch Switch (written by Thomas W. Lynch, Jonas E. Agin, and Vijal M. Patel; directed by Adam Weissman)
 Mr. Tager Goes To Earth (written by Therese Beaupre, directed by Sean Dwyer)
 Area 51 (written by Erik Saltzgaber, directed by Adam Weissman)
 Recalling The Past (written and directed by Tom Chehak)
 The Gates Of Galidor Part 1: The Gauntlet (written by Alex Epstein, directed by Giles Walker)
 The Gates Of Galidor Part 2 (written by Tom Chehak, directed by Adam Weissman)

Toy line
A Galidor-themed Lego toy line of the same name was produced by the Lego Group in 2002. Unlike other Lego themes, these were simply action figures with swappable body parts, akin to a simplified version of Lego's Bionicle theme. The theme was considered a commercial failure, due to over specialized parts and limited compatibility with other Lego themes. The Lego designers who worked on the theme were also heavily disappointed with the quality of the TV series, expecting Galidor to be a larger success after their recent work on Bionicle and Lego Star Wars. Other Lego designers blamed Galidor's failure to being a case of self-competition due to being launched while Bionicle was at its peak popularity. Only 15 Galidor sets were released overall, with 2 sets in limited quantities and 2 cancelled sets. The specialized molds of Galidor along with those for other less successful themes such as Scala, Znap and Primo contributed to an inflated Lego production catalog from 6,000 parts up to 12,000; which became a major sunk cost in tooling for the company.

Despite these issues Galidor did offer several innovative accomplishments for Lego, including the electronic Kek Powerizer figure that interacted with the television show. The Kek Powerizer included lines of dialogue delivered via Brian Hamilton (actor) and a small electronic screen with mini-games on it. The socket joint introduced in Galidor would later be adapted for use in Bionicle, Lego Alpha Team and notably in Lego Exo Force with the gradual introduction of new pieces that allowed Galidor parts to easily connect with Lego Technic and System style sets.

Galidor along with other failures of the era lead to Lego's near bankruptcy in the early 2000s. Lego designer Mark Stafford would later comment that he believed Galidor was the biggest contributor to the era's fiscal failures. A Lego fan subculture for Galidor has emerged in the years since fueled by both nostalgia and ironic enjoyment, most notably with Lego designer Nick Vas; who helped contribute to the design of the 2017 The Lego Ninjago Movie set Ninjago City which contained a minifigure wearing a Galidor shirt, along with a Galidor sticker element featuring Nick and Allegra depicted as traditional Lego minifigures as a nod to the former series and its place in Lego history.,

The theme was referenced in Lego Marvel Super Heroes - Guardians of the Galaxy: The Thanos Threat where Star-Lord and Gamora discussing directions should they take to reach the Avengers, Peter mentions that one of the planets is named Galidor.

Video game

An eponymous video game adaption of Galidor was developed for Game Boy Advance by Tiertex Design Studios, and for Microsoft Windows, PlayStation 2 and GameCube by Asylum Entertainment. In May 2002, publisher Electronic Arts first displayed the Game Boy Advance and PlayStation 2 versions at E3 2002. The Game Boy Advance game was released by Lego Interactive and Electronic Arts on October 29, 2002, to the North American market. The game received a mixed reception, with reviews usually citing repetitive gameplay and unresponsive controls. Asylum Entertainment's take on the game was initially scheduled for a release in early 2003, and in July 2003, Electronic Arts announced that would be released in September of that year; however, on September 3, 2003, Asylum Entertainment announced that, due to financial instability, they had cancelled their Galidor game for all platforms, and laid off the game's team. The unfinished PC version was eventually found in various budget re-releases of individual Lego video games, or Lego video game bundles, released by Focus Multimedia and ValuSoft in Europe and North America, respectively.

References

External links
 
 

2002 American television series debuts
2002 American television series endings
2002 Canadian television series debuts
2002 Canadian television series endings
2000s American mystery television series
2000s American science fiction television series
2000s Canadian science fiction television series
American action television series
American adventure television series
American science fiction television series
American television shows featuring puppetry
Canadian action television series
Canadian adventure television series
Canadian mystery television series
Canadian science fiction television series
Canadian television shows featuring puppetry
English-language television shows
Fox Broadcasting Company original programming
Fox Kids
YTV (Canadian TV channel) original programming
Television series about teenagers
Television series reboots
2002 video games
Action-adventure games
Game Boy Advance games
Tiertex Design Studios games
Lego video games
Video game reboots
Windows games
Cancelled PlayStation 2 games
Cancelled GameCube games
Video games developed in the United Kingdom